Gouldtown is an unincorporated community and census-designated place (CDP) in Cumberland County, in the U.S. state of New Jersey. It is in the northwestern part of the county, in the northeast part of Fairfield Township, and it is bordered to the west by the city of Bridgeton, the county seat. New Jersey Route 49 runs through the community, leading east  to Millville and west through Bridgeton  to Salem.

Demographics
As of the 2020 United States census, the population was 1,601.

History
Monroe Work catalogued it among "Negro" communities in his Negro Yearbook series.

Gouldtown was first listed as a CDP prior to the 2020 census. Trinity African Methodist Episcopal Church, organized in 1818, current building constructed in 1860, is listed on the National Register of Historic Places.

Notable people 

People who were born in, residents of, or otherwise closely associated with Gouldtown include:
Harold Gould (1924–2012), baseball pitcher with the Philadelphia Stars of the Negro National League.
Theophilus Gould Steward (1843–1924), U.S. Army chaplain, Buffalo Soldier, organizer of A.M.E. congregations in South Carolina and Georgia

See also
Whitesboro, New Jersey
Lawnside, New Jersey
Springtown, New Jersey

Further reading
Gouldtown, a Very Remarkable Settlement of Ancient Date: Studies of Some Sturdy Examples of the Simple Life, Together with Sketches of Early Colonial History of Cumberland County and Southern New Jersey and Some Early Genealogical Records originally published in some for in 1913 in and published in 1923 Theophilus Gould Steward and William Steward

References 

Census-designated places in Cumberland County, New Jersey
Census-designated places in New Jersey
Fairfield Township, Cumberland County, New Jersey